2,2-Dimethoxypropane (DMP) is an organic compound with the formula (CH3)2C(OCH3)2. A colorless liquid, it is the product of the condensation of acetone and methanol. DMP is used as a water scavenger in water-sensitive reactions. Upon acid-catalyzed reaction, DMP reacts quantitatively with water to form acetone and methanol. This property can be used to accurately determine the amount of water in a sample, alternatively to the Karl Fischer method.

DMP is specifically used to prepare acetonides:
RCHOHCHOHCH2 + (MeO)2CMe2 → RCHCHCH2O2CMe2 + 2 MeOH

Dimethoxypropane is an intermediate for the synthesis of 2-methoxypropene.

In histology, DMP is used for the dehydration of animal tissue.

References

External links
 MSDS
 MSDS

Methylating agents
Ethers
Ketals
Reagents for organic chemistry